The Grandison D. Royston House is a historic house at Columbus and Water Streets in Historic Washington State Park, Washington, Arkansas. The main entry is centered under a projecting gable-roof porch, and is framed by sidelights and transom windows. The porch is supported at the front by pairs of square columns with moulded capitals and a square plinth. At the back of the house is a shed-roof addition which housed the kitchen. The interior of the main block is divided into four rooms, two on either side of a large central hall.

The house was built c. 1833 by Grandison Delaney Royston, then at the start of a long and distinguished career in Arkansas politics, serving in the state legislature, as United States District Attorney, and as a state militia general during the American Civil War.

The house was listed on the National Register of Historic Places in 1972.  It is one of the finest early examples of the Greek Revival in the state.

See also
National Register of Historic Places listings in Hempstead County, Arkansas

References

Houses on the National Register of Historic Places in Arkansas
Greek Revival houses in Arkansas
Houses completed in 1833
1833 establishments in Arkansas Territory
Houses in Hempstead County, Arkansas
National Register of Historic Places in Hempstead County, Arkansas
Historic district contributing properties in Arkansas